Yantai Economic and Technological Development Area (YEDA), is an economic development zone established in 1984 in Shandong Province, China.  It is near the Yellow Sea coast, and administratively under Yantai Prefecture.  It covers 228 km2 and has a population of 400,000. Before its creation, most of the area were fishing villages. Now it is an industrial and famous tourist site in Shandong

Industry
YEDA is the largest producer of automotive parts in China (2006). Core industries at YEDA include industrial machinery, automobiles and parts, electronics, artificial fibers and textiles, and bio-pharmaceutics. A Foxconn plant nearby is a large source of employment in the district.

Transportation
The Zone is connected by bus to Yantai and nearby Penglai. Most residents use Yantai's train station and airport to travel elsewhere.

Tourism
Yantai Economic and Technological Development Zone's beach(金沙滩jinshatan) is a well known tourist destination in China.

Notes

External links
 website of the Investment Promotion Agency of YEDA in English
 Official  Yantai Economic and Technological Development Zone (YEDA) website in Chinese

County-level divisions of Shandong
Special Economic Zones of China
Yantai